Maria Conceição da Costa Ferreira (born 13 March 1962 in Aveleda) is a retired Portuguese long-distance runner.

She won the 1993 IAAF World Half Marathon Championships, and finished sixth in 10,000 metres at the 1993 World Championships.

International competitions

References

1962 births
Living people
Portuguese female long-distance runners
Portuguese female marathon runners
Olympic athletes of Portugal
Athletes (track and field) at the 1984 Summer Olympics
Athletes (track and field) at the 1988 Summer Olympics
Athletes (track and field) at the 1992 Summer Olympics
Athletes (track and field) at the 1996 Summer Olympics
European Athletics Championships medalists
World Athletics Championships athletes for Portugal
World Athletics Half Marathon Championships winners
Portuguese female cross country runners
Competitors at the 1986 Goodwill Games